The Castor and Pollux group (also known as the San Ildefonso Group, after San Ildefonso in Segovia, Spain, the location of the palace of La Granja at which it was kept until 1839) is an ancient Roman sculptural group of the 1st century AD, now in the Museo del Prado, Madrid.

Drawing on 5th- and 4th-century BC Greek sculptures in the Praxitelean tradition, such as the Apollo Sauroctonos and the "Westmacott Ephebe", and without copying any single known Greek sculpture, it shows two idealised nude youths, both wearing laurel wreaths. The young men lean against each other, and to their left on an altar is a small female figure, usually interpreted as a statue of a female divinity. She holds a sphere, variously interpreted as an egg or pomegranate.  The group is 161 cm high and is now accepted as portraying Castor and Pollux.

Identification

The lefthand figure was originally headless but was restored in the 17th century, the heyday of interpretive restorations, by Ippolito Buzzi, when the sculpture was in the collection of Cardinal Ludovico Ludovisi, using a Hadrianic-era (ca. 130) bust of Antinous of the Apollo-Antinous type from another statue. The identification of the figures inspired many choices of male pairs during the 17th and 18th centuries. During the 19th century, it became known as "Antinous and Hadrian's genius", to get over the problem of their both being youths, whereas ahistorically it was an important feature of Antinous' relationship with Hadrian that Antinous was a youthful eromenos and Hadrian an elder erastes. Alternatively  "Antinous and a sacrificial daemon" was suggested, in reference to the myth that Antinous had killed himself as a sacrifice to lengthen Hadrian's life), or simply as Antinous and Hadrian pledging their fidelity to one another.

Other alternative identifications in the past have included:
Hypnos and Thanatos, interpreting the sphere as a pomegranate, symbol of death
Corydon and Alexis
Winckelmann's suggestion of Orestes and Pylades offering a sacrifice to the statue of goddess Artemis, which they wanted to seize, or in front of the tomb of murdered Agamemnon. Winckelmann was the first to publish the sculpture, in Monumenti Antichi Inediti 1767, pp xxi–xxii.

All these identifications are now thought to be erroneous and simply due to the figure's restoration as Antinous: the group is now accepted as Castor and Pollux, offering a sacrifice to Persephone.  Such an identification is based on the right-hand figure, who holds two torches, one downturned (on a flower-wreathed altar) and one upturned (behind his back), and on identifying the woman's sphere as an egg (like that from which the Dioscuri were born).  The interpretation was supported by Goethe, who owned a cast of the group.

Some scholars assert that the statute group was originally created by the ancient sculptor Pasiteles.

Style

The work is an outstanding example of neo-Attic eclecticism frequent at the end of the Roman Republic and during the first decades of the Roman Empire, around the Augustan period, combining two different aesthetic streams: whilst the right-hand youth is Polyclitean, the left-hand one is in a softer, more sensual and Praxitelean style.

History

Its findsite is unknown, but by 1623 it was in the Ludovisi collection at the Villa Ludovisi in Rome, where the Ludovisi restorer, the sculptor Ippolito Buzzi (1562–1634), restored it that year. Nicolas Poussin (illustration, left) saw it in the Ludovisi collection or in that of Cardinal Camillo Massimo, who owned it later. Poussin's sketch was not intended as a faithful representation of the sculpture, but to be stored and referred to, as part of his visual repertory of antiquities, which was extensive and which made its presence felt in most of his paintings. In his sketch of the San Ildefonso group Poussin has made minor adjustments to the poses, but his major change is in transforming the lithe adolescents into more muscular athletes or heroes.

Its reputation soon spread and shortly after 1664 it was acquired by Queen Christina of Sweden to join the large art collection that she gathered during her stay in Rome. The ancient sculptures in that collection were transferred to the Odescalchi who, in 1724, offered this group to Philip V of Spain. Philip's second wife Isabella Farnese (from the Farnese of Parma, which had a history of sculpture collecting) acquired it at above-market price for him and had it sent to the Palace of La Granja de San Ildefonso (Segovia).  From there it came into the Prado (catalogue number Catalogue Nr. E.28).

Copies

The erroneous identification with Antinous generated high interest in the sculpture, with large numbers of copies being produced, largely made in Italy and Northern Europe and based on plaster casts rather than made in Spain and based on the original there.  These inevitably stoked the interest by obscuring the fact that the Antinous head was in fact a restoration, instead smoothing the two into a meaningful whole (as did the casts on which they were based).

Notes

References
Main site about copies of the Ildefonso (or Castor & Pollux) group : http://www.antinoos.info/copies1.htm Copies
 Caroline Vout, Antinous: The Face of the Antique (Henry Moore Sculpture Trust, 2006), p83
 Jules David Prown, 'Benjamin West and the Use of Antiquity' (American Art, Vol. 10, No. 2 – Summer, 1996), pp. 28–49
 Bryn Mawr Classical Review 2006.02.36 – Stephan F. Schröder, Katalog der antiken Skulpturen des Museo del Prado in Madrid. Vol. 2: Idealplastik. Mainz am Rhein:  von Zabern, 2004.  Pp. xii, 537. .
 Francis Haskell and Nicholas Penny, Taste and the Antique (Yale University Press) 1981.
 Viktor Rydberg, Romerska dagar (Roman Days, 1877)
 John Addington Symonds, Excerpts from "Antinous," in 'Sketches and Studies in Italy and Greece' – "could we but understand [the group's] meaning clearly, the mystery of Antinous would be solved"

External links

 Prado link (English)
 Copies
 Image
 Copy by Joseph Nollekens at the Victoria and Albert Museum
 Another view (large) (Flickr)
 Back view (large) (Flickr)
 (The Flickr images were taken after the statue was moved to the British Galleries; previously it had stood against a wall, preventing its back from being photographed)
 Re-created using 3D computer generated characters as part of 'Classics' by Beverley Hood, 2001

1st-century Roman sculptures
1623 archaeological discoveries
Sculptures of the Museo del Prado
Sculptures of men in Spain
Sculptures of Greek mythology
Neo-Attic sculptures